The list of ship commissionings in 1912 includes a chronological list of all ships commissioned in 1912.


See also

References 

1912
1912 ships